1833 in sports describes the year's events in world sport.

Baseball
Events
 Merger of the Olympic and Camden town ball clubs from Philadelphia and Camden, New Jersey, constituting the Olympic Ball Club of Philadelphia, often called the "Philadelphia Olympics".  The constitution would be revised in 1837 and published in 1838.

Boxing
Events
 30 May — James Burke defeats Simon Byrne in 99 rounds.  There are serious concerns about Byrne's health  in the aftermath of the fight.
 2 June — Byrne dies of injuries from the fight and Burke is arrested.
 11 July — at Burke's trial, he is exonerated from blame for Byrne's death.
 Controversy about the English title continues as the now retired Jem Ward refuses to recognise Burke.  The death of Byrne effectively ruins Burke's career and he is stigmatised.

Cricket
Events
 John Nyren publishes The Cricketers Of My Time which has been serialised in The Town during the previous year
 First use by Sheffield Cricket Club of Yorkshire as a team name instead of Sheffield
England
 Most runs – Tom Marsden 181 @ 16.45 (HS 53)
 Most wickets – William Lillywhite 37 (BB 6–?)

Horse racing
England
 1,000 Guineas Stakes – Tarantella 
 2,000 Guineas Stakes – Clearwell
 The Derby – Dangerous
 The Oaks – Vespa
 St. Leger Stakes – Rockingham

Rowing
The Boat Race
 The Oxford and Cambridge Boat Race is not held this year

References

 
Sports by year